The Charcoal Burner is a Norwegian fairy tale, collected by Peter Christen Asbjørnsen and Jørgen Moe.

Published in the book Norwegian Folk Tales 1 (1990) 

It is similar to the Grimm Brothers tale known as Doctor Know-all , and is classified as Aarne–Thompson Type 1641, "Being in the right place at the right time".  Another tale of this type is Almondseed and Almondella.

Plot summary

A charcoal burner becomes a parson by means of various tricks.

Unintentionally he detects some thieves in the king's castle, gains a prophetic reputation in the church, passes a test set by the king, and predicts the queen's having twins.

See also

Class satire

References
 Folk Tales on Illnesses and Cures

External links
 Doctor Know-All and other folktales of Aarne-Thompson type 1641
 Illustration at Digitalt Museum by Erik Werenskiold

Norwegian fairy tales
ATU 1640-1674
Asbjørnsen and Moe